Woolfe: The Red Hood Diaries is a side-scrolling platform hack and slash video game developed and published by Belgian independent development studio GriN Gamestudio. The game was released on 17 March 2015 for Microsoft Windows.

On 10 August 2015, Wim Wouters, producer at GriN Gamestudio, published an announcement on the studio's website, in which he stated that the studio has closed down and requested bankruptcy, cancelling the development on the game's sequel Woolfe Volume 2. He claims that poor sales and bad reviews put GriN Gamestudio into a massive debt that they could not pay back, as well as leaving them with the inability to provide the backer rewards promised to people who helped fund the game on Kickstarter.

Following the shut-down, the Woolfe IP was acquired by Rebellion Developments on 21 October 2015, willing to deliver the Kickstarter backer rewards.

Gameplay

Plot

Development and release 

The game was partially financed by the Vlaams Audiovisueel Fonds (Flanders Audiovisual Funds), which supplied 60,000 €, and the Participatiemaatschappij Vlaanderen Cultuurinvest (PMV Culture Investment). Additionally, it was funded through a Kickstarter campaign, with which the developer raised $72,139. The game initially launched on 17 March 2015 for Microsoft Windows through Steam, with the PlayStation 4 and Xbox One version still in development. The console version were later canceled, leading up to the complete close-down of GriN Gamestudio, and the cancellation of planned sequel Woolfe Volume 2, on 10 August 2015.

On 21 October 2015, it was announced that Rebellion Developments had obtained the IP to Woolfe, gaining its publishing and development rights. Following the acquisition, they announced that they were going to deliver the backer rewards that were advertised on the game's Kickstarter campaign for those who helped fund the game. The rewards later started being shipped on 4 November 2015.

Reception 

Woolfe: The Red Hood Diaries was largely met with average to negative reviews from critics, currently holding a score of 55 out of 100 on Metacritic, and a score of 51.69% on GameRankings.

References

External links 
 

2015 video games
Cancelled PlayStation 4 games
Cancelled Xbox One games
Dark fantasy video games
Hack and slash games
Platform games
Single-player video games
Unreal Engine games
Video games developed in Belgium
Video games featuring female protagonists
Video games with 2.5D graphics
Windows games
Windows-only games
Works based on Little Red Riding Hood
Video games based on fairy tales